The April Spring Friendship Art Festival is the largest international competition held in North Korea since 1982.

The last performance took place in 2018 with 500 foreign shows. This was carried out in moments of tension due to joint military exercises between South Korea and the United States.

References 

Spring festivals
Festivals in North Korea
Events in Pyongyang